Clinch Mountain is a mountain ridge in the U.S. states of Tennessee and Virginia, lying in the ridge-and-valley section of the Appalachian Mountains. From its southern terminus at Kitts Point, which lies at the intersection of Knox, Union and Grainger counties near Blaine, Tennessee, it runs in a generally east-northeasterly direction to Garden Mountain near Burke's Garden, Virginia. It separates the Clinch River basin, to the north, and the Holston River basin, to the south.

Geography

It runs generally southwest-northeast, with numerous curves. Due to its size it is sometimes called a mountain range or complex. The ridge includes the sub-range of Knob Mountain, as well as four summits above 4,000 feet (Beartown Mountain, Flattop Mountain, Morris Knob, and Chimney Rock Peak).

For its entire length, Clinch Mountain has only one true gap through which the ridge is completely sliced in half and continues as Clinch Mountain on either side, divided by Big Moccasin Creek. It is named Moccasin Gap and runs between Weber City and Gate City, Virginia. The Norfolk Southern Railway and U.S. Highways 23-58-421 utilize that gap because there is no elevation in the division of the mountain. Moccasin Gap is currently planned to undergo major mountain removal to accommodate a planned highway project.  The natural appearance of the gap will be altered significantly. 30 miles northeast of Moccasin Gap, in Russell County, U.S. Highway 58 Alternate crosses Clinch Mountain at Brumley Mountain, between Hansonville and Abingdon.
 
All other transportation crossings, as noted below, require an elevation climb to the top of the Clinch Mountain.

When U.S. Highway 25E was realigned into a four-lane highway northwest of Bean Station, Tennessee in the 1980s, it was necessary to cut a new gap into the top of Clinch Mountain, which lowered the original gap elevation by 200 feet. That realignment, along with the lowering of Interstate 26-U.S. Highway 23 at Sams Gap on the Tennessee-North Carolina border, are the only instances of a highway gap in Tennessee actually lowering an original gap where a state or federal highway was built through. (Sams Gap was lowered by 150 feet to accommodate the new Interstate 26 highway).

History
Clinch Mountain is named after the Clinch River, which was named after an 18th-century explorer. The earliest known reference to the name is in the 18th-century journal of Dr. Thomas Walker: "Clinch's River, from one Clinch a hunter" (Stewart, 1967:146).

The Wilderness Road to the Cumberland Gap crossed Clinch Mountain at Moccasin Gap, which Moccasin Creek flows through to join the Holston River to the south.

Signal Point peak situated near Kitts Point, the southern terminus of Clinch Mountain, was used to signal troops during the Civil War.  The mountains along the Clinch Mountain Ridge also played an important role in the Battle of Bean's Station.  Apart from battles, the mountains in Grainger County, Tennessee had prominence in the late 1800s when the mineral springs in the area drew notable visitors from around the globe. Tate Springs, as the town and resort were named, included an enormous hotel, golf course and mineral baths. The seasonal resort even had its own spur on the railroad, so visitors could easily make the trip from all over the country. Notable guests included the Fords, Studebakers, Mellons, Firestones and Rockefellers. Because of a devastating fire and the Great Depression, only a few buildings survive today.

In the 1970s through the 1980s, plans for a 75-mile-long hiking trail system known as the Trail of the Lonesome Pine were proposed to run along the ridgeline of Clinch Mountain from the Tennessee-Virginia state line in Hancock County to its terminus in the city of Blaine in Grainger County. The plans were met with extreme opposition from unwilling property owners, particularly those from Grainger County, as the project would be nearly complete in the Hawkins and Hancock portions of the trail system. With the unwillingness from Grainger County property owners, the trail system would be abandoned all-together in 1981 despite the completion of construction outside of Grainger County.

Music
"Way Up on Clinch Mountain," a folk song based on a 17th-century Scottish ballad, was recorded by Woody Guthrie as "Rye Whiskey," and is included in Carl Sandburg's American Songbag.  The song is credited by him with inspiring the legion of "Bang Bang Lulu" variants. The Carter Family immortalized the American mountain in their 1928 "My Clinch Mountain Home." A fiddle tune called "Clinch Mountain Backstep" (attributed to Ralph Stanley) is in the Appalachian folk repertoire.

Literature
Clinch Mountain is also the referenced home of one branch the Sackett family tree, a fictional family that Louis L'Amour made famous with a series of seventeen books.

Liberty University in Lynchburg, Virginia produced an original work in 2018 based on several individuals and families from this area. Bloodroot: The Ballad of Clinch Mountain, was created by the Women's Writing Project at Liberty. The play is based on actual events ranging from the 18th to the 20th century. Characters include Mary Draper Ingles, Orelena Hawks Puckett, the Carter family, and several others of note.

Transportation crossings
The following crossings of Clinch Mountain can be made, from southwest to northeast:
Tennessee
 Joppa Mountain Road connects Joppa and Powder Springs via Powder Spring Gap.

 U.S. Route 25E (State Route 32) connects Tazewell and Bean Station via Bean Gap.
 State Route 31 connects Spruce Pine and Treadway via Flat Gap.
 State Route 66 connects Klondike and Lee Valley via Big War Gap.
 State Route 70 connects Alumwell and Eidson via Little War Gap.
Virginia
 The CSX Kingsport Subdivision connects Kermit and Speers Ferry via the Clinch Mountain Tunnel.
 U.S. Route 23/U.S. Route 58/U.S. Route 421 and the Norfolk Southern Railway Appalachia Division connect Weber City and Gate City via Moccasin Gap.
 State Route 612 connects Mendota and Collinwood via Fugate Gap.
 U.S. Route 19/U.S. Route 58 Alternate connects Holston and Hansonville via Little Moccasin Gap.
 State Route 80 connects the settlement of Hayters Gap and Rockdell via Hayters Gap.
 State Route 91 connects Tannersville and Maiden Spring via an unnamed crossing.
 State Route 16 connects Asberrys and Benbow via an unnamed crossing.

See also
 Clinch Mountain Boys
 Clinch Mountain Wildlife Management Area

References

 
 
 Stewart, George R. (1967). Names on the Land. Boston: Houghton Mifflin Company.

Ridges of Tennessee
Ridges of Virginia
Landforms of Knox County, Tennessee
Landforms of Union County, Tennessee
Landforms of Grainger County, Tennessee
Landforms of Scott County, Virginia